Hymenagaricus is a genus of fungi in the family Agaricaceae. The widespread genus contains species found largely in tropical regions. Hymenagaricus was circumscribedby Belgian mycologist Paul Heinemann in 1981.

Species
Hymenagaricus alphitochrous (Berk. & Broome) Heinem. 1981
Hymenagaricus ardosiaecolor  (Heinem.) Heinem. 1985
Hymenagaricus caespitosus D.A.Reid & Eicker 1995 – Africa
Hymenagaricus calicutensis Heinem. & Little Flower 1984
Hymenagaricus canoruber (Berk. & Broome) Heinem. & Little Flower 1984
Hymenagaricus cylindrocystis Heinem. & Little Flower 1984
Hymenagaricus epipastus (Berk. & Broome) Heinem. & Little Flower 1984 – Sri Lanka
Hymenagaricus fuscobrunneus  D.A.Reid & Eicker 1998 – South Africa
Hymenagaricus hymenopileus  (Heinem.) Heinem. 1981
Hymenagaricus kivuensis  Heinem. 1984
Hymenagaricus laticystis  Heinem. 1985
Hymenagaricus nigrovinosus  (Pegler) Heinem. 1981
Hymenagaricus nigroviolaceus Heinem. 1985
Hymenagaricus ochraceoluteus  D.A.Reid & Eicker 1998 – South Africa
Hymenagaricus olivaceus Heinem. 1985
Hymenagaricus pallidodiscus  D.A.Reid & Eicker 1999 – South Africa
Hymenagaricus rufomarginatus  D.A.Reid & Eicker 1998 – South Africa
Hymenagaricus subaeruginosus  (Berk. & Broome) Heinem. & Little Flower 1984
Hymenagaricus taiwanensis  Zhu L.Yang, Z.W.Ge & C.M.Chen 2008 – Taiwan

See also
List of Agaricaceae genera
List of Agaricales genera

References

Agaricaceae
Agaricales genera